Trimethylindium, often abbreviated to TMI or TMIn, is the organoindium compound with the formula In(CH3)3. It is a colorless, pyrophoric solid. Unlike trimethylaluminium, but akin to trimethylgallium, TMI is monomeric.

Preparation
TMI is prepared by the reaction of indium trichloride with methyl lithium.

 InCl3 + 3LiMe → Me3In.OEt2  + 3LiCl

Properties 
Compared to trimethylaluminium and trimethylgallium, InMe3 is a weaker Lewis acid.  It forms adducts with secondary amines and phosphines. A complex with the heterocyclic triazine ligand (PriNCH2)3 forms a complex with 6-coordinate In, where the C-In-C angles are 114°-117° with three long bonds to the tridentate ligand with N-In-N angles of 48.6° and long In-N bonds of 278 pm.

Structure
In the gaseous state InMe3 is monomeric, with a trigonal planar structure, and in benzene solution it is tetrameric. 
In the solid state there are two polymorphs, a tetragonal phase which is obtained, for example, by sublimation and a lower density rhombohedral phase discovered in 2005, when InMe3 re-crystallised from hexane solution. 

In the tetragonal form InMe3 is tetrameric as in benzene solution and there is bridging between tetramers to give an infinite network. Each indium atom is five coordinate, in a distorted trigonal planar configuration, the three shortest bonds,(ca. 216 pm ) are those in the equatorial plane, with longer axial bonds, 308 pm for the In-C bonds joining the InMe3 units to form the tetramers and 356 pm for the In-C linking the tetramers into an infinite network. The solid state structures of GaMe3 and TlMe3 are similar.  The association in the solid state accounts for the high melting point of 89°-89.8 °C compared to triethylindium which melts at -32 °C. 

The rhombohedral form of InMe3 consists of cyclic hexamers with 12 membered (InC)6 rings in an extended chair conformation. The hexamers are interlinked into an infinite network. Indium atoms are five coordinate the equatorial In-C distances average 216.7pm almost identical to the average for the tetragonal form, and the axial bonds are 302.8pm joining the InMe3 units into hexamers and 313.4 pm linking the hexamers to form the infinite network.

Application to microelectronics
Indium is a component of several compound semiconductors, including as InP, InAs, InN, InSb, GaInAs, InGaN, AlGaInP, AlInP, and AlInGaNP. These materials are prepared by metalorganic vapour phase epitaxy (MOVPE) and TMI is the preferred source for the indium component.  High purity in TMI (99.9999% pure or greater) is essential for many of these applications. For some materials, electron mobilities are observed as high as 287,000 cm²/Vs at 77 K and 5400 cm²/Vs at 300 K, and background carrier concentration as low as 6×1013 cm−3.

Vapor pressure equation
The vapor pressure equation log P (Torr) = 10.98–3204/T (K) describes TMI within a wide range of MOVPE growth conditions.

Safety
TMI is pyrophoric.

References

External links
 Interesting research notes by Linus Pauling in re: Trimethylindium and its structure; Notebook # 19, Page 049, August 1955.
 Interactive Vapor Pressure Chart for metalorganics.

Chemical vapour deposition precursors
Indium compounds
Methyl complexes